Nebojša Jelenković (born 26 May 1978) is a former Serbian professional footballer who played as a defensive midfielder.

He has played more than 290 domestic games with Litex Lovech and holds the record for the second most domestic games played by a foreigner in the Bulgarian A Group. He is also the first foreigner to become a captain of a Bulgarian team. In 2004, he obtained a Bulgarian passport.

Career

In Serbia
Jelenković began his career at hometown club Novi Sad. In the summer of 1998, he signed with FR Yugoslavia champions Obilić.

Litex Lovech
In 1999 Jelenković moved to Litex Lovech. He made his first appearance for Litex in a Champions League qualification match against Widzew Łódź, on 28 July 1999. His league debut came on 8 August, in a 1–0 loss against Slavia Sofia on the opening day of the 1999–00 season. On 20 November 1999, Nebojša scored his first goals, scoring twice in a 3–1 away win over Velbazhd Kyustendil. He scored his final goal of the season in a 6–0 win at home over Volov Shumen on 1 April 2000.

On 29 August 2002, Jelenković scored his first-ever European goal in a 3–1 away win over Lithuanian Atlantas Klaipėda in their 2002–03 UEFA Cup qualifying round second leg tie. Three weeks later, he scored an own goal in a 1–0 home loss against Panathinaikos in the first round of the tournament.

In 2006, Jelenković was on the radar of then Bulgarian manager Hristo Stoichkov as a prospective candidate for the national team, but eventually did not meet the eligibility criteria because of having appeared in matches for the FR Yugoslavia U-21. In the same year CSKA Sofia attempted to secure the services of the Serbian midfielder.

On 30 August 2007, Kuban Krasnodar confirmed Jelenković has joined on loan for three months. He spent most of his time with Kuban on the bench, making only three Russian Premier League appearances. In December Jelenković returned to Litex and earned 12 appearances in the Bulgarian A PFG, scoring one goal to the end of the season.

Spartak Trnava
At the end of 2007–08 season his contract expired and Jelenković signed with Spartak Trnava on a one-year contract for the 2008–09 season. He earned 27 appearances playing in the Corgoň liga, scored one goal and the team finished in third place.

Return to Litex Lovech
On 12 June 2009, Jelenković again came back to Litex Lovech on a long-term contract. On 12 March 2011, he made his 250th appearance for Litex in the Bulgarian A PFG, in a 2–1 win over Pirin Blagoevgrad. Jelenković announced his retirement at the end of the 2012–13 season. He has featured on 293 occasions in the A PFG and is currently second on the all-time appearance list among foreign players in the top flight of Bulgarian football (after Macedonian Vančo Trajanov).

Career statistics

Awards
Litex Lovech
 Bulgarian A PFG 2009–10, 2010–11
 Bulgarian Supercup 2010
3 times Bulgarian Cup winner: 2001, 2004 and 2008

References

External links
 FK Obilić Team Profile
 

1978 births
Living people
Footballers from Novi Sad
Serbian footballers
Association football midfielders
RFK Novi Sad 1921 players
FK Obilić players
PFC Litex Lovech players
FC Kuban Krasnodar players
FC Spartak Trnava players
First Professional Football League (Bulgaria) players
Russian Premier League players
Slovak Super Liga players
Serbian expatriate footballers
Expatriate footballers in Bulgaria
Serbian expatriate sportspeople in Bulgaria
Expatriate footballers in Russia
Serbian expatriate sportspeople in Russia
Expatriate footballers in Slovakia
Serbian expatriate sportspeople in Slovakia